Víctor Abel Nazario Brun (born 12 January 1983) is a Uruguayan former footballer.

Career statistics

Club

Notes

References

1983 births
Living people
People from Melo, Uruguay
Association football defenders
Uruguayan footballers
Uruguayan Primera División players
Venezuelan Primera División players
China League One players
Uruguayan Segunda División players
Cerro Largo F.C. players
Montevideo Wanderers F.C. players
Caracas FC players
Beijing Institute of Technology F.C. players
Uruguayan expatriate footballers
Uruguayan expatriate sportspeople in Venezuela
Expatriate footballers in Venezuela
Uruguayan expatriate sportspeople in China
Expatriate footballers in China